Darbara Singh Guru is an Indian politician belongs 
to the Shiromani Akali Dal party and a retired IAS officer. He remained the Principal Secretary to former Chief Minister of Punjab, Parkash Singh Badal from 2007 to 2011.  He has also remained the Deputy Commissioner for Jalandhar. He contested for the 2019 2019 Indian General Election in Punjab from the constituency of Fatehgarh Sahib district but lost to Amar Singh from Indian National Congress putting up a tough fight.

Controversy 
Guru's name was featured in the Punjab and Haryana High Court petition, accused of indiscriminate firing and killing of 4 Sikh youth in Nakodar in 1986. He was the officiating Deputy Commissioner for Jalandhar in February 1986 and also officiated as the District Magistrate. Following the sacrilege on Gurdwara Guru Arjan in Nakodar on 2 February 1986, Darbara signed the curfew orders for February 3. He ordered the protesters to go to a different location where the police opened fire.

Darbara Singh Guru has denied any association with the killings.

References 

Shiromani Akali Dal politicians
Indian Sikhs
Indian Administrative Service officers
Year of birth missing (living people)
Living people